Annika Bruhns (born August 8, 1966) is a German musical theater performer.

Biography 
Daughter to Wibke Bruhns, a journalist, and Werner Bruhns, an actor. She was born in Hamburg, Germany and moved with her family to Jerusalem, Israel in 1980. After she graduated from high school her family moved to Washington DC, US, where she majored in German literature and history at Connecticut College, New England, CT. She then continued her studies at the American Musical and Dramatic Academy (AMDA) in New York City, NY, where she graduated with honours. She started her performance career in NYC.

Bruhns debuted as Nina in NYC in a small Off-Broadway production of Anton Czechov's play The Seagull. From then on she continued working as a musical theater performer, moving to Vienna, Austria for the European Opening of Les Misérables in 1988. Many productions in the German speaking countries followed.

Annika Bruhns started teaching musical theater related subjects such as audition prep, song interpretation, stage improv as well as scene study in 2004. She has taught at the renowned Joop van den Ende Academy in Hamburg, Germany as well as at the Hamburg School of Entertainment.

Presently she divides her time between Sweden and Germany. She is married to Swedish musical theater performer Mickey Petersson and they have a son.

Credits

Theatre

Tour

Film

Discography

References 

German musical theatre actresses
1966 births
Living people